Vladimir Lučić may refer to:

Vladimir Lučić (born 1989), Serbian basketball player
Vladimir Lučić (basketball, born 1982), Serbian basketball coach
Vladimir Lučić (footballer) (born 2002), Serbian footballer